Siegfried Meister (17 October 1938 – 28 July 2017) was a German billionaire businessman, founder and 63% owner of Rational AG.

Early life
Meister was born in 1938. He trained as an electrical engineer.

Career
In 1973, he founded Rational AG, which rose to success as a result of the popularity of the combination steamer, which he helped to develop. He owned 63.7% of Rational.

In March 2017, Forbes estimated his net worth at US$3.8 billion.

Personal life
He was married to Gabriella Meister, and they lived in Landsberg am Lech, Germany. He died on 28 July 2017.

References

1938 births
2017 deaths
German billionaires
People from Landsberg am Lech
German electrical engineers
German company founders
20th-century German businesspeople
21st-century German businesspeople
Engineers from Bavaria